Sipah-e-Muhammad Pakistan (S.M.P) (English: Soldiers of Muhammad) was a Shia organisation and a former political party in Pakistan that was formed in 1993 by Allama Mureed Abbas Yazdani and now after his shahdat and long period of time again his nephew Malik Muhammad Wasi Ul Baqar is looking forward  to take responsibility of running Sipah-e-Muhammad Pakistan

History
Shia leader Maulana Mureed Abbas Yazdani formed Sipa-e-Muhammad Pakistan in 1993; it is believed to be armed wing of Tehreek-e-Jafria Pakistan. Its headquarters is in Thokar Niaz Beg, Lahore and its leader was Ghulam Raza Naqvi who was imprisoned in 1996 and released in 2014. Since his death in 2016, it is unclear who leads the group.

Activities
Sipah-e-Muhammad's primary aim was to target the sectarian leadership of the banned terrorist Deobandi militia Sipah-e-Sahaba or Lashkar-e-Jhangvi. However, with the subsequent rise in the violence against Shia Muslims, it was thought to be reforming.

The movement was strong in various Shia communities in Pakistan, and in the majority Shia town of Thokar Niaz Beg of Lahore, ran a "virtual state within a state" in the 1990s.

Affiliations
Sipah-e-Muhammad is alleged to have ties with Iran.

Designation as a terrorist organization
The Government of Pakistan designated Sipah-e-Muhammad a terrorist organization in 2002; it is classified as a Foreign Terrorist Organization under U.S. law,  and its finances are blocked worldwide by the U.S government.

See also

 Shia Islam in Pakistan
 Majlis Wahdat-e-Muslimeen
 Shia Ulema Council
 Tehrik-e-Jafaria
 Imamia Students Organisation

References

1993 establishments in Pakistan
Islamic political parties in Pakistan
Shia Islamist groups
Religious paramilitary organizations
Shia Islam in Pakistan
Organisations designated as terrorist by Pakistan
Organizations designated as terrorist by the United States
Jihadist groups in Pakistan
Violence against Shia Muslims in Pakistan